Nelsonville is a city  in northwest York Township in Athens County, Ohio. It is 60 miles southeast of Columbus. The population was 4,612 at the 2020 census originally, but an official citywide recount found the population to be 5,373, thus maintaining city status in the State of Ohio. It is the home town of Hocking College.

Geography
Nelsonville is located at  (39.455167, −82.225650), along the Hocking River; Monday Creek flows through the eastern part of the city.  One of the main streets, Canal Street, is located over where the old Hocking Canal once ran.

Nelsonville is located on U.S. Route 33. A bypass was completed in December 2013 for the village.

Demographics

As of the census of 2010, there were 5,392 people, 1,969 households, and 920 families residing in the city. The racial makeup of the city was 94.2% White, 2.8% African American, 0.5% Native American, 0.3% Asian, 0.1% Pacific Islander, 0.4% from other races, and 1.7% from two or more races. Hispanic or Latino of any race were 1.4% of the population.

There were 1,969 households, of which 25.5% had children under the age of 18 living with them, 26.4% were married couples living together, 14.7% had a female householder with no husband present, 5.7% had a male householder with no wife present, and 53.3% were non-families. 36.3% of all households were made up of individuals, and 9.2% had someone living alone who was 65 years of age or older. The average household size was 2.24 and the average family size was 2.96.

The median age in the city was 25.1 years. 17.4% of residents were under the age of 18; 32.4% were between the ages of 18 and 24; 24.4% were from 25 to 44; 16.7% were from 45 to 64; and 9% were 65 years of age or older. The gender makeup of the village was 54.8% male and 45.2% female.

Education
The residents of Nelsonville are served by the Nelsonville-York City School District and Nelsonville-York High School.

Nelsonville has a public library, which is the main branch of the Athens County Public Libraries.

History and culture
First settled in 1814 by the Daniel Nelson, Nelsonville was incorporated in 1838 with Charles Cable as its first mayor. 
Nelsonville blossomed into a classic Appalachian town by the mid-19th century, relying on the extractive industries of coal, clay and salt.  Like many large mining towns, Nelsonville was home to a large hotel, The Dew House, and a thriving theater, Stuart's Opera House, both located on the Public Square.

During the American Civil War's famed Morgan's Raid, Confederate cavalry under Brig. Gen. John Hunt Morgan paused in Nelsonville in July 1863 and burned ten wooden canal boats. However, the 400 confederates failed to destroy a covered bridge over the Hocking Canal when citizens rushed to extinguish the blaze after the raiders rode off. This allowed Union cavalry to continue their pursuit of the fleeing Confederates when they arrived in Nelsonville two hours later.  Upon arriving in town, the Union cavalry was delighted that the townspeople had prepared a feast for them.

In 1888, Nelsonville became the first city in the United States west of the Allegheny Mountains to have citywide electric street lights.  

Recent years have brought a revival of sorts to Nelsonville, capturing its artistic spirit in an effort to restore the Public Square into an Arts District.  Most recently, Nelsonville was admitted into the national Main Street Program, and named a Preserve America Community.  The central business district has also been placed on the National Register of Historic Places, and both the Dew House and Stuart's Opera House have been listed separately. Nelsonville was home to a number of companies that used the area's dense clay to produce many different types of bricks, particularly glazed paving bricks, some with a distinctive star pattern (see photo). Many of the sidewalks in the public square and historic district contain these bricks.

Nelsonville owes its existence to the coal mining industry. In more recent years, its main industrial base was the Rocky Shoes & Boots factory, which has since moved out of the country, but continues to maintain the new Rocky Gear Store, set in the renovated, original factory next to Rocky Brands corporate offices. Another important employer is Hocking Technical College. Other major employers in Nelsonville include: Tri-County Career Center, ED MAP (a course materials management company), OhioHealth Nelsonville Health Center,  Nelsonville-York City Schools, Southeastern Ohio Regional Jail, Hocking Valley Residential Center, and Start Community Justice Center.

Nelsonville is organized around a downtown district called the Public Square with art galleries, local restaurants (Mama Rene's Pizza, Rhapsody Restaurant), a bar (The Mine Tavern), cafes (FullBrooks Cafe) and often shows at the renovated Stuart's Opera House, Ohio's only historical & operational 2nd story, 19th-century theater.

The main commercial district is centered on Canal Street that runs from the eastern to western corporation limits.  Recent developments have occurred on Canal Street over the past decade.

Nelsonville is surrounded by Ohio's only national forest, the Wayne National Forest.

Tourism
The Hocking Valley Scenic Railway began as part of the historic Hocking Valley Railway in the early 1870s.  Today, the railway offers scenic excursions from Nelsonville to Logan, traversing the Hocking Hills.  Known for their specialty trains, the Hocking Valley Scenic Railway hosts thousands of passengers each year.  Seasonal train rides include:  Easter Train, Robbery Trains, North Pole Express, Fall Foliage Trips, Haunted Hills Train, Santa Train, Caboose Train, Great Hocking Valley Train Pull and wine trains.  During World War II, the original Hocking Valley Railroad ran 138 steam locomotives, 70 passenger cars and 15,000 freight cars along 340 route-miles of track.  Today, the trains of the Hocking Valley Scenic Railway again pull out of Nelsonville, for pleasure this time, to take passengers on leisurely glides through beautiful, Southeastern Ohio.
Two train rides depart from the railroad depot at U.S. Rt. 33 and the Hocking Parkway Drive on Saturdays and Sundays, Memorial Day Weekend through the end of October, in addition to the seasonal train rides.  The Nelsonville Yards were once the busiest railroad yards in the entire state of Ohio.

Stuart's Opera House, built in 1879, is Ohio's last remaining fully operating 2nd story opera house, and is located on the Nelsonville's Public Square.  Stuart's hosts over 75 events a year including: concerts, plays, films, art and more.  Several theater groups perform at Stuart's, including the local Athenian Berean Community (ABC) Players. The opera house also offers private events for weddings, receptions and special community events. 

The Dew Hotel is also located on the Public Square.  The former hotel has a noted balcony where President William Howard Taft, President William McKinley, President Warren G. Harding and President Theodore Roosevelt all campaigned.

Nelsonville's Square Arts District is also known as the Public Square. Nelsonville's Public Square, adorned with Star Bricks, is home to several shops, restaurants, business offices and financial institutions (Nelsonville First National Bank, Nelsonville Home & Savings, Foundation for Appalachian Ohio). 

Rocky Brands, Inc. was founded in Nelsonville in 1932 as the Wm. Brooks Co. and the corporate headquarters are still located in the city.  The former shoe factory now serves as the Rocky Outdoor Gear Store, and features three floors of outerwear, clothing, home interiors, specialty food products and boots.

The Nelsonville Cross was erected on Kontner's Hill in April, 1973.  It is a Memorial Cross to Mrs. Elizabeth Smith Schwartz by her husband Mr. Walter L. Schwartz.  Mr. Schwartz wanted to honor his wife by sharing their faith with their hometown, where they grew up together and later married. The body of the cross is 4.5 feet by 4.5 feet, the cross arm is 25 feet in length and the body is 65 feet tall, anchored to a base of concrete which rises 8 feet above the hilltop.  Manufactured of metal of special composition which includes steel and aluminum, it bears a porcelain white color.  Newspapers in all parts of America and Europe have carried photographs of it as the "World's Largest Metal Cross", illuminated at night.  Nelsonville has received much publicity from its location.

Hocking College provides several tourist opportunities in Nelsonville.  One stop at Hocking is Robins Crossing, a restored pioneer village located on both the Hocking Valley Scenic Railway train route and the Hockhocking Adena Bikeway.  This collection of restored log cabins showcases pioneer life, and includes a general store, school house, and a blacksmith's shop.  During the warm season, demonstrations are performed at Robins Crossing on most Saturdays and Sundays, and the Hocking Valley Scenic Railway is available to experience the village.  Hocking Technical College also is home to Hocking Woods Nature Center where visitors can learn about animals native to the region.

The Nelsonville portion of the bikeway runs from the Inn at Hocking Technical College to the Nelsonville Public Square district. It is designed for walking, running, biking, cross-country skiing, skating, and wheelchairs.

The Brick Kiln Park is located on the grounds of the former Nelsonville Brick Company.  In the 19th century, the Hocking Valley was known for its abundance of natural resources, particularly clay. Numerous brick companies began to form after the iron furnaces went out of blast. One of the first to emerge was the Nelsonville Brick Company.  In 1877, the Nelsonville Brick Company began their extensive operation. The Nelsonville Block, Hallwood Block, Hocking Block, and the Star Brick were all manufactured by them. In 1880, more kilns and stacks were constructed as an expansion. Nearly twenty-five million blocks and bricks were manufactured each year to keep up with the high demand. The railroads stayed busy transporting their products throughout the Midwest.  The blocks and bricks manufactured in Nelsonville were very popular. One of them in particular was known as the king of all pavers, the Nelsonville Block. The salt glazed surface not only made it watertight, it also gave it a distinct and attractive finish. In 1904, the Nelsonville Block won first prize at the World's Fair in St. Louis.  The Great Depression, combined with the use of concrete, led to the demise of the Nelsonville Brick Company. In 1937, the plant closed down. Although the main plant is gone, a few kilns and stacks, which were part of the expansion in 1880, still remain.  An effort is underway to save the remaining kilns and stacks.

The Wayne National Forest, the only national forest in Ohio, surrounds the city of Nelsonville.  The forest headquarters are located just outside the city limits on US Route 33, overlooking the Hocking River.  It includes Ohio's largest collection of ATV trails.  Tourist activities include:  hiking, canoeing, mountain biking, ATV riding, and bird watching.

In film
Nelsonville has three connections to Hollywood. It is the birthplace of actress Sarah Jessica Parker, who is best known for her portrayal of Carrie Bradshaw on HBO's Sex and the City. 
Nelsonville is the hometown in the 1985 film Mischief starring Kelly Preston.  
The Public Square was also filmed in a nationwide commercial in 1986 for the television game show Wheel of Fortune where Pat Sajak and Vanna White traveled around the Nelsonville Public Square in their convertible.

Nelsonville is also the burial place of former Major League Baseball player Estel Crabtree.  "Crabby" lived on Fort Street for years and volunteered throughout the Nelsonville community.  Estel Crayton Crabtree was a Major League Baseball outfielder for the Cincinnati Reds and the St. Louis Cardinals. His playing career was unusual in that he went eight years between major league appearances.

Notable people
 Estel Crabtree, Major League Baseball player
 Robert T. Oestreicher, 45th mayor of Columbus, Ohio and former President of Columbus City Council
 Sarah Jessica Parker, award-winning actress
 James B. Preston, Professor and Chairman of the Department of Physiology at SUNY Upstate Medical University
 Eugenia Sheppard, American fashion writer and newspaper columnist 
 Phebe Sudlow, superintendent of public schools in Davenport, IA, president of Iowa State Teachers Association, professor at University of Iowa
 Erica Terwillegar, American Olympic luger  
 Lloyd Thomas, naval aviator
 Jacqueline Woodson, award-winning children's author
 Catherine Woolley, neuroendocrinologist
 Dave Wyatt, Negro leagues infielder and manager

References

https://abc6onyourside.com/amp/news/local/nelsonville-keeps-city-status-after-2020-census-recount

External links

 Nelsonville.net – History
 Nelsonville Area Chamber of Commerce

Cities in Athens County, Ohio
Populated places established in 1814
1814 establishments in Ohio
Cities in Ohio